Jozo Kljaković (3 March 188910 October 1969) was a Croatian painter.

He studied in Prague and then at an Arts institute in Rome. He also studied fresco painting in Paris. Kljaković was professor at the Academy of Fine Arts in Zagreb from 1921 to 1943. Notably, he painted a cycle of 14 frescoes for the St. Mark's Church in Zagreb. He was chiefly influenced by Art Nouveau, Ferdinand Hodler and Ivan Meštrović, a friend of his. In Croatia he is credited as a "master of fresco painting".

References

1889 births
1969 deaths
Croatian painters
People from Solin